James "Jim" G. Moffatt (birth unknown – death unknown) was a Scottish rugby union and professional rugby league footballer who played in the 1890s and 1900s. He played club level rugby union (RU) for Melrose RFC, as a forward, and representative level rugby league (RL) for Other Nationalities and Lancashire, and at club level for Oldham (Heritage No. 36) and Leeds, as a forward (prior to the specialist positions of), during the era of contested scrums.

Playing career

International honours
Jim Moffatt won a cap playing as a forward, i.e. number 9 (in an experimental 12-a-side match), for Other Nationalities (RL) while at Leeds in the 9–3 victory over England at Central Park, Wigan on Tuesday 5 April 1904, in the first ever international rugby league match.

Challenge Cup Final appearances
Jim Moffatt played as a forward, i.e. number 13, and scored a try in Oldham's 19–9 victory over Hunslet in 1899 Challenge Cup Final during the 1898–99 season at Fallowfield Stadium, Manchester.

References

External links
Search for "Moffatt" at espnscrum.com
Search for "Moffat" at espnscrum.com
Dai Harris' Rugby League cap v England 1904
Statistics at orl-heritagetrust.org.uk
Scots have played their part
Search for "James Moffatt" "Rugby" at britishnewspaperarchive.co.uk

Lancashire rugby league team players
Leeds Rhinos players
Melrose RFC players
Oldham R.L.F.C. players
Other Nationalities rugby league team players
Place of birth missing
Place of death missing
Rugby league forwards
Rugby league players from Scottish Borders
Rugby union forwards
Rugby union players from Scottish Borders
Scottish rugby league players
Scottish rugby union players
Year of birth missing
Year of death missing